The white-collared pigeon (Columba albitorques) is a species of bird in the family Columbidae.

The species is endemic to the Ethiopian highlands in Eritrea and Ethiopia. It occupies countryside surrounding rocky cliffs and gorgesand is also common in town centres.

The species is monotypic: no subspecies are recognised.

Description
It is a large grey-brown pigeon with a conspicuous white hindcollar contrasting with a slate-grey head. In flight it shows prominent white wing patches formed by white inner primary coverts.

References

 

white-collared pigeon
Birds of the Horn of Africa
Fauna of the Ethiopian Highlands
white-collared pigeon
Taxonomy articles created by Polbot